The F type Adelaide tram was a class of 84 bogie, drop centre, combination trams built between 1921 and 1929 for the Municipal Tramways Trust (MTT). All bar three were built by A Pengelly & Co, Adelaide with 262, 283 and 284 being built by the MTT's Hackney workshops. The first 50 were built as the F type, while the last 34 were classified as the F1 type, the latter having an all steel as opposed to partly wooden underframe. Some remained in service until the network closed in November 1958.

Preservation
Two have been preserved:
264 & 282 by the Tramway Museum, St Kilda

References

Adelaide tram vehicles